Zdeněk Česka (6 February 1929 – 14 January 2023) was a Czech academic, lawyer, and politician.

Česka died on 14 January 2023, at the age of 93.

References

1929 births
2023 deaths
Czech lawyers
Communist Party of Czechoslovakia politicians
Members of the Central Committee of the Communist Party of Czechoslovakia
Members of the Chamber of the People of Czechoslovakia (1976–1981)
Charles University alumni
Rectors of Charles University
Politicians from Prague